Antibiosis is a biological interaction between two or more organisms that is detrimental to at least one of them; it can also be an antagonistic association between an organism and the metabolic substances produced by another. Examples of antibiosis include the relationship between antibiotics and bacteria or animals and disease-causing pathogens. The study of antibiosis and its role in antibiotics has led to the expansion of knowledge in the field of microbiology. Molecular processes such cell wall synthesis and recycling, for example, have become better understood through the study of how antibiotics affect beta-lactam development through the antibiosis relationship and interaction of the particular drugs with the bacteria subjected to the compound.

Antibiosis is typically studied in host plant populations and extends to the insects which feed upon them.

"Antibiosis resistance affects the biology of the insect so pest abundance and subsequent damage is reduced compared to that which would have occurred if the insect was on a susceptible crop variety. Antibiosis resistance often results in increased mortality or reduced longevity and reproduction of the insect."

During a study of antibiosis, it was determine that the means to achieving effective antibiosis is remaining still. "When you give antibiotic-producing bacteria a structured medium, they affix to substrate, grow clonally, and produce a “no mans land,” absent competitors, where the antibiotics diffuse outward." Antibiosis is most effective when resources are neither plentiful nor sparse. Antibiosis should be considered as the median on the scale of resource, due to its ideal performance.

See also 
 Antibiotic
 Biological pest control
 Biotechnology
 Symbiosis

References

Further reading

External links 

Biological interactions
Antibiotics

pt:Relação ecológica#Amensalismo ou antibiose